Tavtimanovo (Tawtömän) is a rural locality (a selo) and the administrative centre of Tavtimanovsky Selsoviet, Iglinsky District, Bashkortostan, Russia. The population was 2,219 as of 2010. There are 25 streets.

Geography 
Tavtimanovo is located 20 km northeast of Iglino (the district's administrative centre) by road. Klyuchevskoye is the nearest rural locality.

References 

Rural localities in Iglinsky District